Christine Marie Cabanos is an American voice actress of Filipino descent. Some of her roles include Azusa Nakano in K-On!, the titular characters in Squid Girl and Puella Magi Madoka Magica, Mako Mankanshoku in Kill la Kill, Hisone Amakasu in Dragon Pilot: Hisone and Masotan, Hotaru Tomoe/Sailor Saturn from the Viz Media redub of Sailor Moon, Shiemi Moriyama in Blue Exorcist, Silica in Sword Art Online, and Minori Kushieda in Toradora!. In video games, she voices Nepgear in the Hyperdimension Neptunia series, Chiaki Nanami and Himiko Yumeno in the Danganronpa series, Filia and Fukua in Skullgirls, Amitie in Puyo Puyo Tetris.

Personal life 
In January 2020, Cabanos announced via her Instagram, that on a vacation in the Philippines, she got engaged to her long-time partner, Oscar Garcia. As of 2021, the two have a daughter together.

Filmography

Anime

Animation

Film

Video games

References

External links

 
 

Living people
American video game actresses
American voice actresses
California State University, Fullerton alumni
21st-century American actresses
Place of birth missing (living people)
Year of birth missing (living people)
American actresses of Filipino descent